William Robert Stone (19 April 1894 – 15 June 1975) was an Australian rules footballer who played with Fitzroy in the Victorian Football League (VFL).

Notes

External links 
		

1894 births
1975 deaths
Australian rules footballers from Victoria (Australia)
Fitzroy Football Club players